The  was a commuter electric multiple unit (EMU) train type operated by the private railway operator Odakyu Electric Railway in Japan from November 1969 until March 2012.

Formation
Trains were formed as 4- and 6-car sets as shown below.

4-car sets

The M1 and M2 cars each had one single-arm pantograph.

6-car sets

The M2 and M4 cars each had one single-arm pantograph.

Interior

History

The 5000 series was introduced from 1969, with a total of 15 sets (60 vehicles) built. These were augmented from 1978 by 20 6-car sets (120 vehicles), classified as 5200 series. Traction motors as well as control device were built by Mitsubishi Electric.

4+6-car formations were gradually replaced by new 4000 series sets, and the 6-car sets were withdrawn following the last day of operations on 30 January 2011. The remaining 4-car sets were withdrawn on 16 March 2012.

References

External links

 Odakyu "last running" site 

Electric multiple units of Japan
5000 series
Train-related introductions in 1969